Mattia Altobelli may refer to:
Mattia Altobelli (footballer, born 1983)
Mattia Altobelli (footballer, born 1995)